Parascolopsis townsendi, commonly known as scaly dwarf monocle bream, is a fish native to the Western Indian Ocean which includes the Gulf of Oman, the Gulf of Aden, the Red Sea and the Arabian Sea. 

Etymology
The fish is named in honor of Capt. Frederick William Townsend (d. 1948), the Commander of the Indian Cable-Ship Patrick Stewart, who collected
many fishes and molluscs while doing cable work in the Persian Gulf, including the type specimen of this species.

References

Russell, B.C., 1990. FAO Species Catalogue. Vol. 12. Nemipterid fishes of the world. (Threadfin breams, whiptail breams, monocle breams, dwarf monocle breams, and coral breams). Family Nemipteridae. An annotated and illustrated catalogue of nemipterid species known to date. FAO Fish. Synop. 125(12):149p. Rome: FAO

Fish of the Indian Ocean
Taxa named by George Albert Boulenger
Fish described in 1901
Nemipteridae